Joyeux may refer to:

People
André Joyeux (born 1871), French artist and teacher
Malik Joyeux (1980–2005), French Polynesian surfer
Maurice Joyeux (1910–1991), French writer and anarchist
Odette Joyeux (1914–2000), French actress, playwright and novelist

Other uses
Joyeux, Ain, commune in eastern France
Joyeux Noël, 2005 French World War I film